In enzymology, a cysteine—tRNA ligase is an enzyme that catalyzes the chemical reaction

ATP + L-cysteine + tRNACys  AMP + diphosphate + L-cysteinyl-tRNACys

The 3 substrates of this enzyme are ATP, L-cysteine, and tRNA(Cys), whereas its 3 products are AMP, diphosphate, and L-cysteinyl-tRNA(Cys).

This enzyme belongs to the family of ligases, to be specific those forming carbon-oxygen bonds in aminoacyl-tRNA and related compounds.  The systematic name of this enzyme class is L-cysteine:tRNACys ligase (AMP-forming). Other names in common use include cysteinyl-tRNA synthetase, cysteinyl-transferRNA synthetase, cysteinyl-transfer ribonucleate synthetase, and cysteine translase.  This enzyme participates in cysteine metabolism and aminoacyl-trna biosynthesis.

Structural studies

References 

 

EC 6.1.1
Enzymes of known structure